Norman Township is one of seventeen townships in Grundy County, Illinois, USA.  As of the 2010 census, its population was 308 and it contained 123 housing units.

Geography

Cities, towns, villages
 Seneca (east edge)

Unincorporated towns
 Langham at 
(This list is based on USGS data and may include former settlements.)

Demographics

Political districts
 Illinois's 11th congressional district
 State House District 75
 State Senate District 38

References
 
 United States Census Bureau 2007 TIGER/Line Shapefiles
 United States National Atlas

External links
 City-Data.com
 Illinois State Archives

Townships in Grundy County, Illinois
Townships in Illinois
1849 establishments in Illinois